Bellmount Forest is a locality in the Upper Lachlan Shire and the Yass Valley Council area, New South Wales, Australia. It lies on the both sides of the Gundaroo Road between Gundaroo and Gunning, about 50 km north of Canberra.

References

Upper Lachlan Shire
Yass Valley Council
Localities in New South Wales
Southern Tablelands